Mariusz Złotek (born 26 April 1970) is a Polish former football referee from the Stalowa Wola district.

Refereeing career
He started working as a referee in 1996. In the 2013–14 season, he started refereeing in the Ekstraklasa, and his first match at this level was the match between Cracovia and Śląsk Wrocław, played on 2 March 2014. In total, he refereed in 144 matches of the Ekstraklasa. In 2021, he retired as a referee. The last match he ruled in Ekstraklasa was the match between Legia Warsaw and Górnik Łęczna on 19 September, and the last match in his career – the Polish Cup match between Stal Gorzyce and Stal Stalowa Wola on 28 September.

References 

1970 births
Living people
Polish football referees